= House of Ahmad Shah Abdali =

House of Ahmad Shah Abdali (Pashto: د احمدشاه بابا کور) is a historical residence in Kandahar, Afghanistan, which belongs to Ahmad Shah Abdali, the founder of Durrani Empire.

== History ==
The house construction was started in 1745 and continued for two years, with Bukharan Architecture. It consists of Abdali's mosque, office and house at the time. After Ahmad Shah death the house was belonging to his successors for about two centuries. In 2022 when the Second Taliban Regime came to power, the house was sold to government and categorized as a historical heritage.

== Topography ==
The house of Ahmad Shah Abdali is located in first district of Kandahar City. It comprises 1448 square meters and has three floor that include eight rooms, one underground and a roof.
